Borys Volodymyrovyh Babin (born 12 March 1981, in Yevpatoria, Ukrainian SSR), is a Ukrainian politician. Expert ad hoc OSCE, Council of Europe and Minority Rights Group International. Doctor of Laws. Professor.

In 2017 he was appointed as the Presidential representative of Ukraine in Crimea that was 2014 that transferred to Kherson due to the annexation of Crimea by the Russian Federation.

References

External links
 Borys Babin International Humanitarian Uni... , Odessa · International Law and Comparative Jurisprudence
 Speech by Borys Babin, Lecturer, Department for Constitutional and International Law, Donetsk Law Institute, Ukraine
 Justice Ministry: The fourth appeal against Russia to the European Court of Human Rights means legal defense of citizens
 Ukrainian authorities do not pay attention to the problems of seafarers

1981 births
Living people
People from Yevpatoria
People from the Crimean Oblast
People of the annexation of Crimea by the Russian Federation
Presidential representatives of Ukraine in Crimea
Ukrainian exiles of the annexation of Crimea by the Russian Federation
Academic staff of the Taras Shevchenko National University of Kyiv